Rastičevo is a village in the municipality of Kupres, Bosnia and Herzegovina  and partially in the Republika Srpska.

Demographics 
According to the 2013 census, its population was 10 with no people in the Republika Srpska part.

References

Populated places in Kupres
Populated places in Kupres, Republika Srpska